The Great World and the Small: More Tales of the Ominous and Magical is a collection of dark fantasy short stories  by American writer Darrell Schweitzer. It was first published in hardcover and trade paperback by Cosmos Books/Wildside Press in July 2001.

Summary
The collection consists of sixteen works of the author, including one of his tales about the legendary madman Tom O'Bedlam. The pieces were originally published from 1978-2000 in various speculative fiction magazines and anthologies.

Contents
 "The Dragon of Camlann" (from The Chronicles of the Round Table, 1997)
 "Believing in the Twentieth Century" (from Terra Incognita no. 1, Win. 1996/1997)
 "Ghost" (from Interzone no. 139, Jan. 1999)
 "The Adventure of the Death-Fetch" (from The Game is Afoot, 1994)
 "The Unwanted Grail" (from The Chronicles of the Holy Grail, Nov. 1996)
 "I Told You So" (from Zodiac Fantastic, Sep. 1997)
 "The Murder of Etelven Thios" (from Weirdbook no. 14, Jun. 1979)
 "The Other Murder of Etelven Thios" (from Weirdbook no. 15, 1981)
 "The Final? Murder? of Etelven Thios?" (from Weirdbook no. 15, 1981)
 "Wanderers and Travellers We Were" (from Andromeda 3, 1978)
 "Silkie Son" (from Weirdbook no. 29, Aut. 1995)
 "Just Suppose" (from Horrors! 365 Scary Stories, Oct. 1998)
 "We Are the Dead" (from The Horror Show v. 6, no. 4, Win. 1988)
 "Tom O'Bedlam and the King of Dreams" (from Weird Tales v. 56, no. 1, Fall 1999)
 "The Invisible Knight's Squire" (from Marion Zimmer Bradley's Fantasy Magazine, no. 48, Sum. 2000)
 "The Great World and the Small" (from Marion Zimmer Bradley's Fantasy Magazine no. 18, Win. 1993)

References

2001 short story collections
Short story collections by Darrell Schweitzer
Fantasy short story collections
Wildside Press books